Monardella antonina is an uncommon species of flowering plant in the mint family known by the common name San Antonio Hills monardella. It is endemic to California, where its two subspecies are restricted to narrow sections of the Central Coast Ranges.

Distribution
The distribution of ssp. antonina is unclear, but it is mainly found in chaparral and wooded slopes in Monterey County. The rarer ssp. benitensis, the San Benito monardella, is a serpentine soils endemic which is mainly limited to the barren hills near the ghost town of New Idria in San Benito County.

Description
This is a pale green, rhizomatous, glandular perennial herb coated in whitish hairs. The oppositely arranged leaves are oval in shape and generally toothed. The inflorescence is a head of several flowers up to 1.5 centimeters wide with a base of leaflike bracts. Each flower is lavender in color. It has two long upper lobes and three lower with four long, protruding stamens at the center.

References

External links
Calflora Database: Monardella antonina (San Antonio Hills monardella)
Jepson Manual eFlora (TJM2) treatment of Monardella villosa — current Jepson classification.
USDA Plants Profile for Monardella antonina (San Antonio Hills monardella)
UC Photos gallery: Monardella villosa — current Jepson classification.

antonina
Endemic flora of California
Natural history of the California chaparral and woodlands
Natural history of the California Coast Ranges
Natural history of San Benito County, California
~
Endemic flora of the San Francisco Bay Area
Flora without expected TNC conservation status